Tahiti (stylized as TAHITI; Korean: 타히티) was a South Korean four-member girl group formed by Dream Star Entertainment in 2012.  The group debuted on July 23, 2012, with the single "Tonight". Their fanclub name is "Black Pearl". Tahiti officially disbanded on July 25, 2018.

History

Pre-debut
Prior to debuting, Tahiti launched a sitcom-style reality program called Ta-Dah! It's Tahiti with their original line-up. The show began broadcasting on April 14, 2012 and was picked up by television stations in South Korea, China, Japan, Taiwan, Malaysia, Indonesia, the Philippines and Singapore.

Following the ending of Ta-Dah! It's Tahiti, it was announced that Ari and Hanhee had left the group and would be replaced by Ye Eun and Keezy.

2012: Debut, line-up change, Hasta Luego and Pretty Face
On July 23, 2012, Tahiti released their debut single "Tonight". Promotions for the single began on July 25, 2012, on Show Champion.

In October, Tahiti unveiled teaser videos and images of their upcoming single "Hasta Luego", which revealed that Ye Eun, Keezy, and EJ were no longer with the group. The three members were replaced with Jinhee, Miso, and Ari, the latter of which had left the group prior to their debut. Ye Eun and Keezy redebuted in 2015 as the R&B duo "Verry", under the names Sina and Soma, respectively. Keezy has also released a solo album entitled "Somablu".
On October 31, 2012, the group released the single "Hasta Luego", which was followed up with the release of "Pretty Face" on December 2, 2012.

2013: First overseas promotions, Five Beats of Hearts and Jin's absence  
On January 19, 2013, Tahiti performed at the SM Mall of Asia Open Grounds in the Philippines, where they performed with Girls' Generation, Exo, U-KISS, Infinite and Tasty. This concert marked Tahiti's first time performing overseas. Tahiti also appeared on Philippine Late night show Gandang Gabi Vice as Guest. They also appeared on Philippine music show ASAP and TV show It's Showtime.

On March 11, 2013, Tahiti released the OST track "Don't Know, Don't Know" for the South Korean television series You're the Best, Lee Soon-shin, where they also made a cameo appearance.

Only July 23, 2013, Tahiti celebrated their one-year anniversary and upcoming mini-album release by holding a showcase.  The group released their first mini-album, Five Beats of Hearts, with the accompanying music video to "Love Sick", on July 25, 2013. Jin did not participate in the music video or live performances of "Love Sick" due to the sexual nature of concept as she was a minor.

2014: Line-up changes and "Oppa, You're Mine"
Dream Star Entertainment announced on June 4, 2014, that Jungbin would not be participating in Tahiti's upcoming promotions due to health issues.  The company did not confirm if her absence will be temporary or permanent.

On June 10, 2014, Tahiti announced the release of their third single "Oppa, You're Mine" through a music video teaser.  The teaser showcased a new member to the group, Jerry.  The music video was released the following day.

2015: Fall Into Temptation, Japanese debut and "Skip"
On January 4, 2015, Tahiti announced the release of the second mini album "Fall Into Temptation" through a teaser clip. Jungbin and Jin did not participate in this comeback either, and their official Twitter accounts were inactive, leading fans to presume that they had left the group, although the company never made a formal statement regarding the matter. On March 12, Tahiti released their first mini album in Japan.

On November 8, 2015,Tahiti made a comeback with a "cute" concept in their 4th single "Skip".

2016–2018: "I Want to Know Your Mind", Jisoo's departure and disbandment 
On May 23, 2016, they released their 5th single "I Want To Know Your Mind" (알쏭달쏭).

On March 16, 2017, Jisoo revealed she had been diagnosed with depression and a panic disorder and on December 8 of the same year, announced she was leaving the group.

On July 25, 2018, it was announced by member Jerry that Tahiti had disbanded.

Members

Former members 
 Miso (Hangul: 미소) 
 Minjae (민재) 
 Jerry (제리) 
 Jungbin (정빈)
 EJ (이제이)
 Keezy (키지)
 Ari (아리)
 Yeeun (예은)
 Jin (진)
 Jisoo (지수)

Timeline

Discography

Extended plays

Singles

Original Soundtracks

References

External links

 

K-pop music groups
South Korean dance music groups
South Korean girl groups